Kujundžić is a Serbo-Croatian surname, an occupational surname derived from kujundžija, a Turkism meaning "silversmith". It may refer to:
Milan Kujundžić Aberdar (1842-1893), Serbian poet, philosopher and politician
Milan Kujundžić (born 1957), Croatian politician
Lazar Kujundžić (1880–1905), Serbian guerrilla fighter
Bogoljub Kujundžić (1887–1949), Serbian politician

Serbian surnames
Croatian surnames
Occupational surnames